Events from the year 1627 in Sweden

Incumbents
 Monarch – Gustaf II Adolf

Events

 April 12–17 – Battle of Czarne
 August – Battle of Dirschau
 The Bollhuset is constructed in the capital of Stockholm.

Births

 Maria Sofia De la Gardie, courtier, banker and industrialist entrepreneur (died 1694) 
 Catharina Wallenstedt, letter writer (died 1719)

Deaths
 Henrik Hybertsson, shipbuilder

References

 
Years of the 17th century in Sweden
Sweden